George Washington Appo (born in New Haven, Connecticut on July 4, 1856; died in New York City on May 17, 1930) was a pickpocket and fraudster whose manner of speech in a testimony became influential in depictions of criminals . George himself wrote an autobiography, unpublished, and became the subject of a book.

Quimbo Appo
Appo's father was a Chinese American with various names ("Quimbo Appo" or "Chang Quimbo Appo", Chinese name "Lee Ah Bow"), while his mother, Catherine Fitzpatrick, was an Irish American. His father spent time in prison, while his mother and sister died enroute to California to visit her brother. His mixed ancestry led a Louis Beck to present Appo as a story warning against "miscegenation".

Incarceration and life of crime
Appo served time in various New York penitentiaries including Sing Sing, the Blackwell's Island Penitentiary, and the upstate penitentiary in Dennamora. In a biography by Timothy Gilfoyle, the prison system of New York in the later half of the 19th century is depicted as being based upon the spoils system and largely corrupt. In the description of Sing Sing, Gilfoyle outlines the stove manufacturing operation the inmates were forced to endure. Gilfoyle describes the penitentiary at Blackwell's Island (now Roosevelt Island) as having lax security, with inmates commonly escaping if they knew how to swim. Appo was also involved in a green goods scam in Poughkeepsie at one point in his life.

See also
 Rebecca Salome Foster - advocate for the rehabilitation of prisoners who took on Appo as an assistant

References 

American fraudsters
American people of Chinese descent
Criminals from New York City
Pickpockets
1856 births
1930 deaths
Inmates of Sing Sing
American people of Irish descent